Stone Bros. (alternatively titled Stoned Bros) is a 2009 Aboriginal Australian stoner comedy film directed by Richard Frankland. It was theatrically released in Australia on 24 September 2009.

Plot
Eddie (Carroll) is working as a cleaner in a museum in Perth, Western Australia, but loses his job because of an accident that sees a series of cardboard cutout images of Australia's Prime Ministers fall down in a domino effect, resulting in an image of John Howard landing on and killing his boss's cat.

When his cousin Charlie (Burchill) trades away Eddie's favourite jacket, he unwittingly loses a sacred stone, entrusted to Eddie by his uncle, which he promised to one day return to its home in Kalgoorlie. This is the final straw, as far as Eddie is concerned, and he sets off to recover the stone and reconnect with his aboriginal roots. Charlie, escaping the wrath of his vengeful girlfriend, forces himself along for the ride, and Eddie's spiritual journey takes a very sharp turn off-track.

Along the way, they pick up what Charlie mistakes for a "hot chick" only to find they are landed with Vinnie (del Torro), a self-described Italian rock star. Soon after they are joined by Eddie and Charlie's transgender cousin Regina (Page), who dreams of making it big on the Koori edition of Australian Idol, and a confused European Australian cop (Phelps) who dreams of going walkabout.

Cast
 Luke Carroll as Eddie
 Leon Burchill as Charlie
 Valentino del Toro as Vinnie (Italian Stallion)
 Peter Phelps as Mark (Prison Guard)
 David Page as Regina
 Luke Hewitt as Barry
 Rohanna Angus as Rhonda
 Jai Courtney as Eric
 Sarah Rachael Olivia Lawrence as Elizabeth

Production
The film is widely regarded as the first feature length Aboriginal Australian comedy film. When asked why there were so few Aboriginal comedies, director Richard Frankland stated that:

Box office
The film was released in Australian cinemas on 24 September 2009 and grossed $24,992 on its opening week in the Australia cinemas. The film ultimately grossed $99,032, making it the 235th highest-grossing film in Australia for 2009.

Director Richard Frankland had originally hoped that teenagers would form a large part of the viewing audience for Stone Bros., however the film received an MA15+ rating, preventing this age group from seeing it at the cinema. This rating was supposedly given due to a deleted scene that involved marijuana buds being cut from a plant.

Soundtrack
 "The Opening" – Shane O'Mara
 "Used to Get High" – John Butler Trio
 "Warriors for Life" – Tjimba and the Yung Warriors
 "Foxtrot" – Shane O'Mara
 "Nobody Knows the Trouble I've Seen" – Kay Starr
 "Pardon My Passion" – Mary G
 "Triumph" – Shane O'Mara
 "Dark Wind" – Richard Frankland
 "Look for Me" – The Charcoal Club
 "Moonstruck" – Sara Storer
 "Lonely Guy" – Shane O'Mara
 "Lets Pretend" – Jack Blanchard & Misty Morgan
 "Thou Shalt Not Steal" – John Butler Trio
 "Banjo Boogie" – Shane O'Mara
 "Asunder" – The Charcoal Club
 "Last Tear" – The Charcoal Club

See also
 Richard Frankland
 Cinema of Australia

References

External links
 
 Stone Bros. DVD
 
 Stone Bros @ Creative Spirits

2009 films
2009 comedy films
Australian comedy films
Films set in Western Australia
Films about Aboriginal Australians
Transgender-related films
Fictional duos
Stoner films
Australian LGBT-related films
2009 LGBT-related films
2000s English-language films